Geoffrey Antrobus (26 May 1904 – 26 May 1991) was a South African first-class cricketer. He was born in Cape Colony and died in Johannesburg. Antrobus made two first-class appearances for Cambridge University Cricket Club in 1925.

Antrobus' nephew, Edward, made two first-class appearances for Cambridge University in 1963.

1904 births
1991 deaths
South African cricketers
Cambridge University cricketers